The Chuya Steppe in the Siberian Altai Mountains is a depression formed by tectonic movement of major faults in the Earth's crust. Its name comes from the large river which runs through the steppe, the Chuya River.

Major settlements

Kosh-Agach is a major village in the north of the steppe. Other large settlements include Chaganuzun and Beltir.

Geology
The Chuya Steppe is filled with Cenozoic sediments, derived from the surrounding mountains of the Chuya Belki.

Seismicity
The 7.3  Altai earthquake shook South Central Siberia with a maximum Mercalli intensity of X (Extreme), causing $10.6–33 million in damage, three deaths, and five injuries.

Grasslands of Russia
Geography of Siberia
Natural history of Siberia
Depressions of Russia
Temperate grasslands, savannas, and shrublands
Geography of the Altai Republic